{{DISPLAYTITLE:C23H22O6}}
The molecular formula C23H22O6 (molar mass: 394.42 g/mol, exact mass: 394.1416 u) may refer to:

 Barbigerone
 Deguelin
 Rotenone* 
 Aureothin

Molecular formulas